Solute carrier family 6, member 20 also known as SLC6A20 is a protein which in humans is encoded by the SLC6A20 gene.

Function 

Transport of small hydrophilic substances across cell membranes is mediated by substrate-specific transporter proteins which have been classified into several families of related genes. The protein encoded by this gene is a member of the subgroup of transporter with unidentified substrates within the Na+ and Cl− coupled transporter family. This gene is expressed in kidney, and its alternative splicing generates 2 transcript variants.

Clinical significance 

Mutation in the SLC6A20 gene are associated with iminoglycinuria.

One of a cluster of 6 genes (SLC6A20, LZTFL1, CCR9, FYCO1, CXCR6 and XCR1) on chromosome 3 at location 3p21.31 associated with a genetic susceptibility to COVID-19 respiratory failure.

References

Further reading 

 
 
 
 
 
 

Solute carrier family